Charles Olin Goold (November 23, 1871 – December 2, 1931), was a pioneer businessman, banker, landholder, and civic leader. He ran the first livery yard in Carmel-by-the-Sea, California in 1907. He owned the Goold Building, which was once called the Hotel Carmel in the early 1910s. He was elected city trustee and Street commissioners of Carmel and was on the board of directors and vice-president of the Bank of Carmel.

Early life 

Charles O. Goold was born on a farm in Henry County, Illinois on November 23, 1871, the son of Horace Goold (1837-1917) and Hannah Ann Gard (1849-1917). Her father was from a local Portuguese whaling family and Carmel Missions' longtime caretaker. Goold went to a business college at Santa Cruz, California, and then worked on his father's farm.

Professional background

In 1897 Goold came to Monterey, California where he worked at horse teaming, cutting wood and tanbark. After teaming for three years, he farmed in Carmel Valley, California, which he had visited as early as 1884. Goold married Mary Ann Machado (1884-1975) on February 20, 1904, at the   
San Carlos Mission 
in Monterey. They had two children, Charles born on May 21, 1906, in Carmel Valley, and Irene born on April 7, 1909 in Carmel-by-the-Sea. 

In 1905, Goold had a contract from Buck's Tannery to haul redwood and tanbark from the south coast through Carmel Valley along the Carmel River route until he reached the 17-Mile Drive and then Pacific Grove. He had several teams, six horses to a team, and built it up to sixty horses. He was an agent for the Western Union and operated out of an office in the Hotel Carmel. 

In 1907, he came to Carmel-by-the-Sea, California and ran a livery stable, taking parties over the 17-Mile Drive with a horse-drawn stage, and later automobile. He did local and long-distance hauling and maintained special automobiles for trips through the valley. He also owned and conducted an auto-stage route from Monterey to Carmel.

In 1912, Goold bought two six-passenger buses (the Carmel Bus) from Shelly Prickles, the Monterey Buick dealer. These were the first motor-powered stages brought to Carmel in competition with horse-drawn stages. Goold bought the Coffey brothers stage and rig business. In June 1915, Goold took over the stage and auto service and advertised it as "Autos for Hire, C. O. Goold." On February 13, 1919, he got a permit to run auto stages. In 1923, he was operating two large auto buses, with White Motor Company trucks with red bodies and black tops. The stages carried mail and passengers to and from the Monterey train station, five miles to the north, into town.

The Hotel Carmel was purchased by Goold about 1916. He rented the hotel space to various businesses such as the Lucky Boy Market, the Erickson's Carmel Dairy, and to Kenneth Wood for his real estate office. On July 25, 1931, the Goold building was badly damaged by a fire that started in the antic of the building. The upper floor was occupied by Mrs. Robert Erickson, daughter of Goold, who was not in the building during the fire. A new Goold Building was built in July 1935. It was built for Goold's wife Mary, son Kenneth Goold, and Amy J. Goold.

Goold was elected both city trustee and Street commissioners of Carmel in April 1924. When the Bank of Carmel opened on July 15, 1923, in a building between Mission and Dolores Streets, the board directors of the bank were: Thomas A. Work, Charles O. Goold, Barnet Segal, Silas V. Mack, and J. A. Sparolini. The Bank of Carmel began with capital stock of $25,000 and with capitalization of $100,000. It was the first commercial bank in Carmel. On January 28, 1924, T. A. Work, C. O. Goold, C. A Metz, Silas W. Mack, and J. A Sparolini were re-elected as directors of the Bank of Carmel. Work was elected as president and Goold was elected as vice-president.

Death
Goold died of a heart attack on December 2, 1931, at the age of 60, in Carmel-by-the-Sea. He was buried at the San Carlos Cemetery in Monterey, California.

See also
 Timeline of Carmel-by-the-Sea, California

References

1871 births
1931 deaths
People from California
People from Illinois
People from Carmel-by-the-Sea, California